Roger Powell FRS, (born 14 June 1949) is a British-born Australian based educator and academic. He is Emeritus professor in the School of Earth Sciences at the University of Melbourne.

Education
Powell was educated at Durham University where he was awarded a Bachelor of Science degree in 1970. He went on to study at the University of Oxford where he was awarded a Doctor of Philosophy degree in 1973 for research on mineral equilibria in the schist rock near Fort William, Scotland supervised by Stephen W. Richardson.

Awards and honours
Powell was elected a Fellow of the Royal Society (FRS) in 2015. His nomination reads: 

Powell, along with Timothy Holland of Cambridge University developed a widely used thermodynamic database for minerals and developed the THERMOCALC software to undertake calculations on geological material. The software and database are housed on the THERMOCALC website.

Powell was also elected a Fellow of the Australian Academy of Science in 2006. He was awarded the Mineralogical Society of Great Britain's Schlumberger Award in 2007,  the Norman L. Bowen Award in 2009 and the Barrow Award in 2021.

References

Living people
Fellows of the Royal Society
Fellows of the Australian Academy of Science
1949 births
Alumni of Durham University